Revelation, in religion and theology, is the act of revealing through communication with supernatural entities.

Revelation(s) may also refer to:

 Book of Revelation or simply Revelation, the last book of the New Testament
 Revelation (Latter Day Saints), teaching of the Latter Day Saint movement
 Private revelation, in the Catholic Church, a revelation from God to a specific Christian
 Revelation of the Veiled, the Persian treatise on Sufism 
 Reveal (narrative), in literature and show business, the exposure of a previously hidden key element of the plot or the performance.

Books and comics
 "Revelation", a poem by Liz Lochhead
 Révélation$, a book by Denis Robert and Ernest Backes concerning banking giant Clearstream

Novels
 Revelation (Sansom novel), a novel by C. J. Sansom
 Revelation (Star Wars novel), eighth book in the Legacy of the Force series
 Revelation, a novel by Carol Berg
 Revelation, a novel by Bill Napier
 Revelation, a novel by Robert J. Szmidt
  "Revelation" (short story), a story by Flannery O'Connor

Comics
 The Transformers: Revelation, a comic book miniseries
 Wildstorm: Revelations, a comic book limited series
 "Spider-Man: Revelations", a comic book event
 Revelations (comics), a comic book series by Dark Horse Comics
 Revelation, a Morlock associated with the X-Men in the Marvel Comics universe

Film and television

Film
 Revelation (1918 film), a film starring Alla Nazimova
 Revelation (1924 film), a film starring Viola Dana, Monte Blue and Lew Cody
 Revelation (2001 film), a horror film directed by Stuart Urban
 Apocalypse II: Revelation, a 1999 Christian/thriller film
 Paradise Lost 2: Revelations, a 2000 documentary film
 Star Wars: Revelations, a 2005 Star Wars fan film
 Revelation – Perth International Film Festival, an annual film festival in Australia
 Revelations Entertainment, an American independent movie production company

Television
 Revelation Films, a British distributor of science fiction, drama and anime television series
 Revelation TV, a British Christian television channel
 Revelation (TV series), a 2020 Australian three-episode documentary series presented by Sarah Ferguson
 Revelations (2005 TV series), a 2005 American event series starring Bill Pullman that aired on NBC
 Revelations – The Initial Journey, a 2002 New Zealand drama series
 Revelations (1994 TV series), a 1994 UK late-night soap
 Red vs. Blue: Revelation, eighth season of a web series

Episodes
 "Revelation" (Grimm)
 "Revelation" (Transformers: Cybertron)
 "Revelation" (Young Justice)
 "Revelations" (Babylon 5)
 "Revelations" (Battlestar Galactica)
 "Revelations" (Buffy the Vampire Slayer)
 "Revelations" (Dead Zone)
 "Revelations" (Hell on Wheels)
 "Revelations" (Ōban Star-Racers)
 "Revelations" (Sanctuary)
 "Revelations" (Sliders)
 "Revelations" (Stargate SG-1)
 "Revelations" (Third Watch)
 "Revelations" (The X-Files)

Music and dance
 Revelations (Alvin Ailey), signature choreographic work of Alvin Ailey American Dance Theater
 Revelation (band), American doom metal band
 The Revelations, British-based pop/soul girl group
 The Revelations featuring Tre Williams
 Revelation Records, American record label
 Revelation Records (jazz), American record label

Albums
 Revelation (98 Degrees album), 2000
 Revelation (Armored Saint album), 2000
 Revelation (The Brian Jonestown Massacre album), 2014
 Revelation (Christopher Lee album), 2006
 Revelation (Joe Nichols album) or the title song, 2004
 Revelation (Journey album) or the title instrumental, "The Journey (Revelation)", 2008
 Revelation (Man album), 1969
 Revelation (Peter Andre album), 2009
 Revelation (Sons of Sylvia album) or the title song, 2010
 Revelation (Third Day album) or the title song, 2008
 Revelation (Ultravox album) or the title song, 1993
 Rev.elation, a 2005 album by Joe Locke and the Milt Jackson Tribute Band
 Revelation, a 2004 album by David Phelps
 Revelation, a 2007 album by Lord Belial
 Revelation, a 2018 album by Reef 
 Revelation, a 2022 album by G.E.M. 
 Revelations (Audioslave album) or the title song (see below), 2007
 Revelations (Fields of the Nephilim album), 1993
 Revelations (Gene album), 1999
 Revelations (Killing Joke album), 1982
 Revelations (McCoy Tyner album), 1988
 Revelations (mind.in.a.box album), 2012
 Revelations (Red Jezebel album), 2004 
 Revelations (Special Ed album), 1995
 Revelations (Vader album), 2002
 Revelations (Wynonna Judd album), 1996
 Revelations, a 1999 EP by Hefner

Songs 
 "Revelation" (Troye Sivan and Jónsi song), 2018
 "Revelation", by Black Veil Brides from Wretched and Divine: The Story of the Wild Ones, 2013
 "Revelation", by Borealis from Purgatory, 2015
 "Revelation", by D12 from Devil's Night, 2001
 "Revelation", by Love from Da Capo, 1966
 "Revelation", by Yellowjackets from Shades, 1986
 "Revelation", by Joe Satriani from Professor Satchafunkilus and the Musterion of Rock, 2008
 "Revelation (Divus Pennae ex Tragoedia)", by Symphony X from Paradise Lost, 2007
 "Revelation (Mother Earth)", by Ozzy Osbourne from Blizzard of Ozz, 1980
 "Revelations" (Audioslave song), 2007
 "Revelations" (Santana song), 1977
 "Revelations", by the Crimson Armada from Guardians, 2009
 "Revelations", by Downthesun from Downthesun, 2002
 "Revelations", by DragonForce from Valley of the Damned, 2003
 "Revelations", by Hed PE from Blackout, 2003
 "Revelations", by Iron Maiden from Piece of Mind, 1983
 "Revelation Song", written by Jennie Lee Riddle and first recorded in 2004; covered by Phillips, Craig and Dean, 2009

Video games
 Revelation Online, PC MMORPG
 Revelations: The Demon Slayer, Game Boy Color RPG
 Revelations: Persona, PlayStation RPG
 Assassin's Creed: Revelations, a game in the Assassin's Creed franchise
 Myst IV: Revelation, a computer game in the Myst franchise
 Prince of Persia: Warrior Within, ported to PlayStation Portable as Prince of Persia: Revelations
 Resident Evil: Revelations, a game in the Resident Evil franchise for the Nintendo 3DS
 Revelation, a fictional computer virus in the video game Uplink
 EVE Online: Revelations, two expansions of the MMORPG Eve Online
 Revelations, Call of Duty: Black Ops III Zombies map

Other uses
 Revelation, a brand of expanding suitcases now marketed by Antler Luggage
 Revelation (cocktail)
 Revelation Mountains, Alaska, U.S.
 Revelation Plaatjie (born 1982), South African cricketer
 Slipstream Revelation, kit aircraft

See also
 
 Book of Revelation (disambiguation)
 The Revelation (disambiguation)
 Reveal (disambiguation)
 Revelación, EP by Selena Gomez